Romeoville station could refer to:

 Romeoville station (Metra), a commuter rail station in Romeoville, Illinois, which opened in 2018
 Romeoville station (Atchison, Topeka and Santa Fe Railway), a demolished station in Romeoville, Illinois